Bernard Kwadwo Amoafo (born September 14, 1994), also known as Kwadwo Sheldon is a Ghanaian YouTube personality and content creator. He was featured in Avance Media 50 Most Influential Young Ghanaians in 2020 and 2021 for his work in media.

Early life and education 
Kwadwo Sheldon is a native of Kwahu Pepease in the Eastern Region of Ghana. His father died when Sheldon was four years old. He attended Pepease Presby Junior High School and Sonrise Christian High School for his junior and senior high level of education respectively. He later attended Ho Technical University formerly Ho Polytechnic and obtained a Higher National Diploma (HND) in Marketing.

Media career
In 2013, he was hired as a social media manager at The Rave Media Group, and in 2016 he was employed by OMG Media where he hosted the show “Yawa of the Day,” a daily comic entertainment news segment where trending news are discussed.

YouTube 
In March 2021, he received the silver play button from YouTube for reaching 100,000 subscribers.

In 2022, he won the "Best YouTuber/Vlogger" award at the Ghana Entertainment Awards USA.

References 

1994 births
Living people
Ghanaian YouTubers
YouTube vloggers